Several ships have been named Hyperion, after Hyperion, a figure from Greek mythology, or after Hyperion, one of Saturn's moons (discovered in 1848).

Ships with the name include:

Commercial ships
, launched at Whitby in 1810. She made voyages to Canada, the Baltic, and India, and was wrecked in the Baltic in 1823.
, launched at Sunderland in 1814. She made one voyage for the British East India Company. Her crew abandoned her at sea in 1824.
, launched 2015. (IMO: 9690559, MMSI: 311000322) She still carries vehicles, but was attacked during the Iran–Israel proxy conflict.

Naval ships
, three ships of the Royal Navy with the name
, the only ship of the US Navy with the name

See also
 Hyperion (disambiguation)

Ship names